"20/20 Vision" is the forty-seventh episode and the twelfth episode of the third season (1988–89) of the television series The Twilight Zone. In this episode, a bank officer sees visions of the future through his eyeglasses.

Plot
An officer of a farmer's bank, Warren Cribbens, is called into the bank manager Mr. Cutler's office. He offers Warren a promotion to loan officer. Warren is more comfortable in his current position but too shy and diffident to express his thoughts clearly, and he gets the promotion. When Warren leaves Cutler's office, a teller, Sandy, bumps into him and accidentally steps on his glasses, cracking them. Warren later looks through his cracked glasses and sees a teller drop a bill into a trash can. When he tells her about it, they look and see nothing. He sees her drop a bill in the trash again, this time without his glasses, and keeps quiet for fear of embarrassing himself further. However, the teller notices there really is a bill in the trash this time.

Cutler tells Warren to foreclose on any mortgages that go past due. But when farmer Vern Slater nears the end of his grace period, Warren offers to look over the property. He finds Slater has underdeveloped the land and is using outdated equipment, and looking through the glasses he sees the farmhouse as dilapidated; the only way Slater can hope to escape foreclosure is to sell off some of his land. Slater becomes hostile once it becomes clear that Warren cannot approve an extension of the grace period.

Warren uses the glasses to get a look at Sandy's future: she falls off a ladder and breaks her neck. He begs her to be careful around the bank and then withdraws his life savings to give Slater a personal loan. Cutler wants Warren to offer Slater bottom dollar for his land as his only alternative to foreclosure, because a highway is planned to run through the land. Warren puts on his glasses and sees Cutler's plan to get rich from the highway land will succeed, meaning that Slater's farm will fail even with the personal loan and Slater will never be able to repay him. Warren nevertheless goes ahead with the loan. When Cutler finds out about Warren's loan to Slater, he fires him. Sandy falls from the ladder but Warren grabs her as she lands. She apologizes for breaking his glasses again but he assures her not to worry as he does not need them anymore, having discovered that he wants to do what is right even when it fails to accomplish anything.

External links
 

1988 American television episodes
The Twilight Zone (1985 TV series season 3) episodes

fr:Vision 20/20